Kirby Park is an urban park in Wilkes-Barre, Pennsylvania.

Kirby Park may also refer to:

 Kirby Park (Aspley), a sports venue for the Aspley Broncos
 Kirby Park (country house), a country house in Kirby Bellars
 Kirby Park railway station, a railway station named for the park around Kirbymount
 Kirby Park (California), a park on Elkhorn Slough
 Kirby Park (Cambria), a park in Cambria, Iowa
 Kirby Park (Houston), a park in River Oaks, Houston, Texas
 Kirby Park (Illinois), a park in Hall Township, Bureau County, Illinois
 Kirby Stud Park, an equestrian facility used by Grace Bowman